Oberleutnant zur See Reinhold Saltzwedel (23 November 1889 – 2 December 1917) was a successful and highly decorated German U-boat commander in the Kaiserliche Marine during World War I. He sank a total of 111 merchant vessels for . On 1 September 1936, his name was given to the 2nd U-boat Flotilla of the Kriegsmarine in Wilhelmshaven to honour him.

Early life
Reinhold Saltzwedel was born on 23 November 1889 in Rosenberg, Upper Silesia. His father was a parson.

World War I
On 19 September 1914, he was promoted to Oberleutnant zur See. In May 1915 he went to the U-boat school. Shortly afterwards, he served as commander of several U-boats. On 20 August 1917, he was awarded the Pour le Mérite for his achievements.

Twenty-nine men lost their lives.

References

External links

1889 births
1917 deaths
People from Olesno
People from the Province of Silesia
U-boat commanders (Imperial German Navy)
Recipients of the Pour le Mérite (military class)
German military personnel killed in World War I
Recipients of the Iron Cross (1914), 1st class
Imperial German Navy personnel of World War I